The Cinema News and Property Gazette was a trade newspaper catering to the British film industry from 1912 until 1975.

References

External links

1912 establishments in the United Kingdom
1975 disestablishments in the United Kingdom
Film magazines published in the United Kingdom
Television magazines published in the United Kingdom
Weekly magazines published in the United Kingdom
Defunct magazines published in the United Kingdom
Magazines established in 1912
Magazines disestablished in 1975
Newspapers published in the United Kingdom
Professional and trade magazines